Pseudocalliergon is a genus of mosses belonging to the family Amblystegiaceae.

The genus was first described by Karl Gustav Limpricht.

The genus has cosmopolitan distribution.

Species:
 Pseudocalliergon lycopodioides Hedenäs, 1990

References

Moss genera
Amblystegiaceae